Bulgers (also Bulger, Bulgers Mill, Bulgers Mills, Oakchyer) is an unincorporated community in Tallapoosa County, Alabama, United States.

Notes

Unincorporated communities in Tallapoosa County, Alabama
Unincorporated communities in Alabama